Arto Kalevi Nyberg (born 28 May 1966, Viiala) is a Finnish journalist working for Yleisradio. He hosts his own talk show called Arto Nyberg. Before getting his own show, Nyberg worked as a journalist and host on the Finnish morning television programme Aamu-TV.

For two years in a row (in 2006 and 2007), Nyberg received the Venla award for best TV performer.
 
Nyberg plays music in the band Nyrok Dolls, plays football and enjoys English beer. He is married to reporter Sara Nyberg and has a son named Max (born 2003).

Books
 Lontoon pubit - 100 parasta! (written with Kari Ylänne), Heinäpään Viestintä Oy 2005

External links

 Arto Nyberg show homepage (in Finnish)

1966 births
Living people
Finnish journalists
Finnish television presenters